Ryu Hee-woon (born June 19, 1995) is the pitcher of KT Wiz of the KBO League. He joined KT Wiz in 2014. He graduated Bugil Academy. He was the national representative of the 26th World Youth Baseball Championships.

On June 14, 2017, he took the mound as a relief pitcher for Samsung Electronics and recorded his first win in his debut.

References

External links 

 Hee-woon Ryu on Baseball Reference

1995 births
Living people
South Korean baseball players
KT Wiz players
People from Cheonan
Sportspeople from South Chungcheong Province